Gabriel Möhlich also Mölich (c. 1590 – 1640s) was a German Baroque composer and dancing master. He graduated from his studies with Heinrich Schütz in 1619 with the publication of his Geistliche Madrigale for 4 and 5 voices, Leipzig. From 1620 he studied ballet in Paris and in 1638 choreographed Schütz's opera-ballet Orpheus und Euridice and ten more Italian ballette.

References

German classical composers
German Baroque composers
Pupils of Heinrich Schütz
1590s births
1640s deaths
17th-century classical composers
German male classical composers
17th-century male musicians